The Office central de lutte contre la délinquance itinérante 

The Central Office for fighting organised crime (OCLDI) is a service of the French National Gendarmerie whose area of competence is the fight against crime committed by habitual criminals who act in organized and itinerant teams in several points of the territory.

The OCLDI was created by decree no. 2004-611 of June 24, 2004, as the successor to the interministerial unit for the fight against itinerant crime (CILDI), which was headed by Jacques Morel at the time. It is attached to the Judicial Police Sub-Directorate of the National Gendarmerie, as are the Central Office for Combating Environmental and Public Health Violations (OCLAESP), the Central Office for Combating Illegal Employment (OCLTI) and the Central Office for Combating Crimes against Humanity, Genocide and War Crimes (OCLCH).

In early 2017, four regional OCLDI detachments, located in Rennes, Toulouse, Sathonay-Camp and Nancy, were deployed, so that the OCLDI's strength now approaches 133 members. A new detachment has been created in Senlis in 2022.

This office is responsible for :

▪ strengthening the effectiveness of the fight against this form of crime by promoting a
better circulation of information between the various administrations concerned ;

▪ observing and studying the most characteristic behaviors of the perpetrators, co-perpetrators and accomplices of the offenses falling within the area of jurisdiction defined

▪ to lead and coordinate, at the national and operational levels, the
investigations relating to these offenses ;

▪ to assist the units of the national gendarmerie and the services of the national police, as well as those of all other interested ministries in the case of offenses falling within the area of competence defined. This assistance does not relieve the services responsible for investigations" (article 4 of the decree).
This office shall intervene, without prejudice to the provisions governing other central offices and international police cooperation bodies :

at the request of the judicial authorities, when the designation of the office appears necessary;

at the request of gendarmerie units, police departments and directorates of other ministries concerned ;

on its own initiative, whenever circumstances so require ;

▪ to have searches relating to itinerant offenders carried out or continued abroad, through the competent international bodies (see Art 5 of the decree).

In order to accomplish its mission, the office centralizes, analyzes, exploits and transmits to the national police, the national gendarmerie and the other administrations concerned, all documentation relating to facts and offenses related to itinerant crime (art 6 of the decree).
Moreover, without prejudice to the application of international conventions and Community texts, particularly in tax or customs matters, and within the specialist service, the office constitutes, for France, the central point of contact in international exchanges. The office works closely to the European Union Agency for Law Enforcement Cooperation (Europol) as well as. Indeed, OCLDI has an important position in the European security which allows it to offer a unique range of services and to serve as a :

- hub for information on criminal activities ;

- centre for law enforcement and research expertise.

maintains operational links with the specialized services of other States and with international organizations, in close collaboration with the relevant services of the central directorate of the judicial police (Art 9 of the decree).

The office has expertise in European projects such as the European Multidisciplinary Platform Against Criminal Threats (EMPACT) which tackles the most important threats posed by organised and serious international crime affecting the EU. As a matter of fact, EMPACT strengthens intelligence, strategic and operational cooperation between national authorities, European institutions and bodies, and international partners. EMPACT runs in four-year cycles focusing on common EU crime priorities.
It introduces an integrated approach to European internal security, involving measures that range from external border controls, police, customs and judicial cooperation to information management, innovation, training, prevention and the external dimension of internal security, as well as public-private partnerships where appropriate.

the office is also involved in the S.W.O.R.D. project, "Struggling against Widespread Organized property crime at the Root and in all its Dimensions", a two-year project, led by the Gendarmerie Nationale and co-financed by the European Union's (EU) Internal Security Fund (ISF)

Acting very frequently on International letters of request, the OCLDI conducts long investigations, involving the use of significant technical resources.
The office does not relieve the units but often supports them, especially the research sections, with its technical expertise or its resources. It rarely leads investigations, except when several judicial police units are involved or when the director general of the national gendarmerie is involved.

To conclude, the Central Office for Itinerant Delinquency (OCLDI), based in Arcueil (Val-de-Marne), is one of the offices under the general direction of the national Gendarmerie, bringing together gendarmerie and police officers, but without the presence of tax or customs personnel. It has nationwide jurisdiction and fights "crime and delinquency committed by habitual criminals who act in structured and itinerant teams at several points in the country", which takes the form of ATM attacks, cargo thefts, foreign exchange swindles, and home robberies, as well as lower-intensity but repetitive offences committed at a great distance from one another. The office does not usually take over the work of the units but often provides technical support and resources

External links 
 Official website (in French)

https://www.legifrance.gouv.fr/loda/id/JORFTEXT000000250795

French Gendarmerie
2004 establishments in France